Julian Farino (born 12 December 1965) is an English film and television producer and director. He was the sports editor of The Guinness Book of Records and directed much of the first three seasons of the HBO series Entourage.  

Farino was born and raised in London and educated at Cambridge University. He began directing film documentaries at Granada Television in England, making a sequence of observational films about drag queens, young classical musicians, children's entertainers and boxers. They Call Us Nutters was a portrait of life on a ward of Ashworth Maximum Security Hospital, and A Winter's Tale described life in the coldest inhabited place on earth, Oymyakon in Eastern Siberia.

In 2000 he directed 7Up 2000, a continuation of the multi-award winning documentary series, featuring 7-year-olds from all over Britain - a project that continued with 14 Up in 2007. His film drama in the UK includes an adaptation of Charles Dickens's Our Mutual Friend, which won four BAFTAs including Best Drama; Bob and Rose, a romantic comedy which won Best Series at The British Comedy Awards; and Flesh and Blood, starring Christopher Eccleston, which won the Prix Europa for Best Film. Other credits in the UK include The Last Yellow for BBC Films starring Samantha Morton and Mark Addy, and Byron, a biopic of the romantic poet, starring Jonny Lee Miller and Vanessa Redgrave.

Farino went to the United States in 2004 to work for HBO, and directed the majority of episodes of the first three seasons of Entourage. He stayed to work on the series Big Love and Rome, and has received four Emmy and three DGA nominations.' He was executive producer and director of the HBO television show How to Make It in America for its two series. For Entourage: The Sundance Kids he was nominated in category Best Directing for a Comedy. In 2010, Farino directed The Oranges starring Hugh Laurie and Leighton Meester, his first feature film in the US. The movie premiered at the Toronto International Film Festival and was released on 5 October 2012. Farino was based in Los Angeles, where he lived with his wife, actress Branka Katić, and their two sons, Louis and Joe before his return to the UK.

During the 1980s, Farino also appeared as a co-presenter on Record Breakers, alongside Fiona Kennedy and main presenter Roy Castle.

Filmography
Marvellous (2014) Film
BAFTA Television Craft Award for Best Director
The Oranges (2011) Film
How to Make It in America (2010) TV series
The Office, US version (2006) TV Series
Big Love (2006) TV Series
Rome (2005) TV Series
Entourage (2004) TV Series
Byron (2003) (TV)
Flesh and Blood (2002) (TV)
Bob & Rose (2001) TV Series
7Up 2000 (2000) (TV)
The Last Yellow (1999)
Sex and the City (1998) TV Series
Our Mutual Friend (1998) (mini) TV Series
Wokenwell (1997) TV Series
Savage Skies (1996) (TV) (segment "The Winter's Tale")
Out of the Blue (1995) TV Series
In Suspicious Circumstances (1994) TV Series
Coronation Street (1960) TV Series
 14up 2000 (2007) (TV, follow up to 7Up 2000)

References

External links

 Director Julian Farino and actor Gemma Jones talk about why the Marvellous experience was a special one.
 The Oranges: How I found myself in a real-life Entourage, Julian Farino at Guardian interview about having a "go" movie in Hollywood, 30 November 2012

British film directors
British television directors
Living people
1965 births